Henry Edward Pafford Medhurst (5 February 1916 – April 1984) was a footballer who played for Woking, West Ham United, Chelsea and Brighton as a goalkeeper.

Football career
Medhurst began his career with Woking. He moved to West Ham in 1938 but managed only 29 games before September 1939 and the outbreak of war. His footballing career was interrupted by World War II in which he served in the British Army as a sergeant. During the war, he guested for Sheffield Wednesday.

On commencement of League football in 1946 Medhurst played only three more times for the Hammers and in 1946 he left West Ham and signed for Chelsea in exchange for Joe Payne. He played 157 games for Chelsea in all competitions.
He left Chelsea in 1952 and played a single season with Brighton before returning to Stamford Bridge as assistant trainer, physiotherapist and trainer until his retirement in 1975. He was awarded a testimonial match which was played in March 1976 between Chelsea and West Ham.

Cricket career
Medhurst was also a keen cricketer playing as a right-handed batsman for Cambridgeshire in the Minor Counties Championship from 1950 until 1953.

Death
He died in Woking, Surrey in April 1984 aged 68.

References

External links

1916 births
1984 deaths
People from Byfleet
English footballers
Association football goalkeepers
Chelsea F.C. players
Woking F.C. players
West Ham United F.C. players
Brighton & Hove Albion F.C. players
English Football League players
British Army personnel of World War II
Sheffield Wednesday F.C. wartime guest players
Chelsea F.C. non-playing staff
English cricketers
Cambridgeshire cricketers
British Army soldiers